Nuñuwa District is one of nine districts of the Melgar Province in Peru. The town of Nuñoa has become a destination for tourists as they start the climb to Macchu Picchu.  The growth of this local tourist industry has been stimulating changes in society, as the anthropologist Morgan Hoke has shown in a study of the impact of tourist eateries, especially pizzerias, on dairy and cheese production and on consequently on women's participation in the Nuñoa economy.

Geography 
Some of the highest mountains of the district are listed below:

Ethnic groups 
The people in the district are mainly indigenous citizens of Quechua descent. Quechua is the language which the majority of the population (83.60%) learnt to speak in childhood, 16.04 	% of the residents started speaking using the Spanish language (2007 Peru Census).

See also 
 Hatun Mayu
 Mawk'allaqta

References